Scrobipalpuloides is a genus of moths in the family Gelechiidae.

Species
 Scrobipalpuloides ascendens Povolný, 1990
 Scrobipalpuloides chiquitella (Busck, 1910)
 Scrobipalpuloides chiquitelloides (Powell & Povolný, 2001)
 Scrobipalpuloides congruens Povolný, 1987
 Scrobipalpuloides dispar Povolný, 1990
 Scrobipalpuloides elaborata (Povolný, 2000)
 Scrobipalpuloides habitans Povolný, 1987
 Scrobipalpuloides inapparens Povolný, 1987
 Scrobipalpuloides insularis (Powell & Povolný, 2001)
 Scrobipalpuloides isolata (Povolný, 2000)
 Scrobipalpuloides spinosa (Povolný, 2000)
 Scrobipalpuloides totalis (Povolný, 2000)
 Scrobipalpuloides truncata (Povolný, 2000)

References

 
Gnorimoschemini